Persela Lamongan U-20 is a reserve football club based in Lamongan, Indonesia. Currently the club plays in EPA U-20, the top flight reserve football league in the country.

2019 squad 
The following players are eligible for Liga 1 U-20 in the current 2019 Liga 1 U-20 season.

Honours

Indonesian Super League U21s
Winners:
2010/11.

References

External links
Official site
Profile at Liga-Indonesia.co.id

Football clubs in Indonesia